Little Britain is a British character-based comedy sketch show which was first broadcast on BBC radio and then turned into a television show. It was written and performed by comic duo David Walliams and Matt Lucas. The show's title is an amalgamation of the terms 'Little England' and 'Great Britain', and is also the name of a Victorian neighbourhood and a modern street in London.

Series overview
Radio

Original series

USA series
</onlyinclude>

Specials

</onlyinclude>

Radio series

Pilot (2000)

Series 1 (2001)

Series 2 (2002)

Special (2019)

Television series

Pilot (2003)

Series 1 (2003)

Series 2 (2004)

Series 3 (2005)

Little Britain Abroad (2006–07)

Little Britain USA (2008)

Comic Relief specials

Comic Relief Special (2005)

Comic Relief Special: Comic Relief Does Little Britain Live (2007)

Comic Relief Special (2009)

Comic Relief Special (2015)

Comic Relief Special (2016)

The Big Night In Special (2020)

References

Little Britain